Beizhong Road is a station under construction on the future Line 18 of the Shanghai Metro. Located at the intersection of Beizhong Road and Lianxi Road in Pudong, Shanghai, the station is scheduled to open with the rest of phase one of Line 18 in 2021.

References 

Railway stations in Shanghai
Shanghai Metro stations in Pudong
Line 18, Shanghai Metro
Railway stations in China opened in 2021